Coenagrion interrogatum, the Subarctic bluet, is a blue and black, pond damsel of the family Coenagrionidae. The species was first described by Edmond de Sélys Longchamps in 1876.

Distribution
According to the University of Alberta E.H. Strickland Entomological Museum:

References

External links

 Subarctic bluet, Talk about Nature
 Subarctic bluet, Montana Field Guide
 Subarctic bluet, Wisconsin MNR
 Lam, Ed. (2004). Damselflies of the Northeast. Forest Hill: Biodiversity Press. p. 41.
 DuBois, Bob (2005). Damselflies of the North Woods. Duluth, MN: Kollath-Stensaas Publ. p. 76-77.

Coenagrionidae
Odonata of North America
Insects described in 1876